Ana Colchero Aragonés (born 9 February 1968 in Veracruz. Mexico) is a Mexican actress and economist.

She is the daughter of Spanish immigrants, father from Madrid, mother from Barcelona. She is the oldest of  four siblings, Fernando, Arantxa and Patricia. She married in 2000 to anthropologist José del Val 18 years her senior, whom she divorced later on.

She finished the career in economics in México and studied acting in Montpellier. She received a role in her first telenovela at the age of 19 with Televisa. Eight years later she obtained her first starring role as Alondra in the same titled production. This telenovela was the number one of the year 1995 and put her at the top of her career. However, she surprised the audience and the network by accepting the starring role in the first telenovela of TV Azteca, Televisa rival network. In spite of good rating she sued TV Azteca for breach of contract and won it years later. Banned from Televisa as well, she obtained a role in Isabella, Mujer enamorada a Peruvian soap opera.

She got married in 2000, and after filming two movies in 2002 she retired from acting and has dedicated her life and her money to support the indigenous people of Chiapas. Ana has recently explored her writing abilities with the successful publication of a novel "Entre dos fuegos" (Between two fires), Ed. Planeta, 2006.

Films

Telenovelas

Peru

TV Azteca

Televisa

Theatre
 La maestra milagrosa
 Don Juan Tenorio
 Los derechos de la Mujer

References

External links
Corazon Salvaje FanSite

Ana Colchero at the Telenovela Database

1968 births
Living people
People from Veracruz (city)
20th-century Mexican actresses
21st-century Mexican actresses
Mexican telenovela actresses
Mexican film actresses
Mexican people of Spanish descent
Mexican economists
Mexican women economists
Mexican women writers
Mexican activists
Mexican women activists
Actresses from Veracruz
Writers from Veracruz